Wake is the debut studio album of Lycia, released in March 1989 through Orphanage Records.

Track listing

Personnel
Adapted from the Wake liner notes.
John Fair – bass guitar, drum machine
Mike VanPortfleet – vocals, guitar

Release History

References

External links
 
 Wake at Bandcamp

1989 debut albums
Lycia (band) albums
Projekt Records albums